is a shoot 'em up video game developed and published by Hudson Soft for the Nintendo Entertainment System and the MSX. The player pilots the starship "Caesar", travelling through space stations occupied by powerful supercomputers known as "Starbrains" who threaten the galactic empire. Star Soldier greatly resembles the earlier  arcade game Star Force.

Star Soldier has spawned numerous sequels, starting with Super Star Soldier on the PC Engine. It was ported to the Game Boy Advance in 2004 in Japan as part of the Famicom Mini series, and to the Wii's Virtual Console in the Japanese and North American regions in July 2007. An enhanced remake of the game was released on PlayStation Portable only in Japan in 2005.

Star Soldier was re-released by Konami on the Nintendo 3DS Virtual Console on November 14, 2012 in Japan, August 15, 2013 in PAL Version and September 24, 2013 in North America, and the iOS Version, titled  on June 20, 2013 in Japan.

References

External links
 Star Soldier (1986)

1986 video games
Nintendo Entertainment System games
MSX games
Game Boy Advance games
Scrolling shooters
Star Soldier
Science fiction video games
Top-down video games
Mobile games
Palm OS games
IOS games
Video games developed in Japan
Video games scored by Takeaki Kunimoto
Nintendo Switch Online games
Virtual Console games for Nintendo 3DS
Virtual Console games for Wii